Pietro Lanfranconi, O.S.A. (1596–1674) was a Roman Catholic prelate who served as Bishop of Terni (1667–1674).

He was born in Ancona, Italy on 22 January 1596 and ordained a priest in the Order of Saint Augustine.
On 3 August 1667, he was appointed during the papacy of Pope Clement IX as Bishop of Terni.
On 21 August 1667, he was consecrated bishop by Giannicolò Conti, Cardinal-Priest of Santa Maria in Traspontina, with Giacomo de Angelis, Archbishop Emeritus of Urbino, Mario Fani, Titular Bishop of Cyrene, serving as co-consecrators. 
He served as Bishop of Terni until his death on 6 March 1674.

While bishop, he was the principal co-consecrator of Matteo Cosentino, Bishop of Anglona-Tursi (1667); and Alessandro Diotallevi, Bishop of Pesaro (1667).

References

External links and additional sources
 (for Chronology of Bishops) 
 (for Chronology of Bishops) 

17th-century Italian Roman Catholic bishops
Bishops appointed by Pope Clement IX
1596 births
1674 deaths
Augustinian bishops